Robert Austin (28 December 1871 – 26 May 1958) was an English cricketer. He played one first-class match for Oxford University Cricket Club in 1894. He was educated at Cheltenham College and Oriel College, Oxford. He became a schoolteacher in England, then moved to South Africa and was headmaster of Parktown Preparatory School in Johannesburg.

See also
 List of Oxford University Cricket Club players

References

External links
 

1871 births
1958 deaths
English cricketers
Oxford University cricketers
Sportspeople from Cheltenham
People educated at Cheltenham College
Alumni of Oriel College, Oxford
Schoolteachers from Gloucestershire
British emigrants to South Africa